Diaphragmistis is a genus of moths of the family Yponomeutidae.

Species
Diaphragmistis macroglena - Meyrick, 1914 

Yponomeutidae